Jarrell may refer to:

Places
 Jarrell Plantation, historic site
 Jarrell, Texas, city in Williamson County

People with the given name Jarrell
 Jarrell Brantley (born 1996), American professional basketball player 
 Jarrell Huang (born 2000), Singaporean singer-songwriter
 Jarrell Miller (born 1988), American boxer and kickboxer

People with the surname Jarrell
 Albert E. Jarrell (1901–1977), commissioned officer in the United States Navy
 Charles Michael Jarrell (born 1940), American prelate of the Roman Catholic Church
 Jae Jarrell (born 1935), American artist
 Mary von Schrader Jarrell (1914–2007), patron of the arts and memoirist
 Michael Jarrell (born 1958), Swiss composer
 Randall Jarrell (1914–1965) American poet, literary critic
 Tommy Jarrell (1901–1985), American fiddler, banjo player, and singer
 Wadsworth Jarrell (born 1929),  African-American painter

See also
 Jarell, given name